Piptostigma oyemense is a species of plant in the Annonaceae family. It is endemic to Gabon.

References

Flora of Gabon
Annonaceae
Vulnerable plants
Endemic flora of Gabon
Taxonomy articles created by Polbot
Taxa named by François Pellegrin